InStore Audio Network (also known as ISAN) is a Utah-based retail media provider of narrowcast in-store music, in-store video content and audio advertising for delivery within supermarkets and drugstores. InStore Audio Network's music programming is housed locally on a music server at each location, containing the music library, audio messages and ISAN's proprietary scheduling and delivery software. This software enables each server to receive new audio ads and music playlists as often as necessary, transferred over the Internet. The playlists dictate what will be played during the following week in that particular store so that every retail store can be customized with its own music and/or audio messages. InStore Audio Network works with America's premier retailers to use audio (both music and messaging) for branding and marketing purposes in the shopping environment.

Clients 
ISAN reports that it provides music and/or audio messages to over 22,000 supermarkets and pharmacies in the United States.  Its typically works with retailers who are national or regional in nature.  Included are stores owned by Ahold (including Giant Food Stores, Stop & Shop, Tops and Martin's), Albertsons (including Safeway and others), Kroger, Supervalu, Meijer and Southeastern Grocers,

Competitors 
InStore Audio Network directly competes with the following companies:

Muzak Holdings / DMX Music / Mood Media
PlayNetwork
 CUSTOMtronics Sound
 MTI Digital
 Startle
 Streamit

See also 
Media franchise

References

External links 
InStore Broadcasting Network

Mass media industry
Music companies of the United States
Industrial music services
Companies based in Salt Lake City